Microcerotermes bugnioni, is a species of small termite of the genus Microcerotermes. It is found from Seenigoda Estate of Sri Lanka. It can be found under logs and in hollow stems of coconut palms.

References

External links
Evolution and Systematic Significance of Wing Micro-sculpturing

Termites
Insects described in 1911